Capers C.M.E. Church, is a historic Christian Methodist Episcopal church built in 1925 in Nashville, Tennessee. It is also known as Caper Memorial Christian Church, and Capers Memorial C.M.E. Church.

It was added to the National Register of Historic Places on January 2, 1985.

History 
The congregation was originally founded as the McKendree African Mission in 1832, near Sulphur Springs. The church was located on Hynes Street and was renamed in 1851 as Capers Chapel in honor of its founder Bishop William C. Capers. In 1870, the Capers Chapel became a member of the Colored Methodist Episcopal Church (C.M.E.) (also known as Christian Methodist Episcopal Church), a Black denomination of Wesleyan Methodism.

It was designed in a Neo-Classic style by African-American founded architectural firm McKissack & McKissack. Moses McKissack Ⅲ of the architectural firm McKissack & McKissack was a church member. The structure is a two-story masonry building, with four stone Doric pilasters.

References

African-American history in Nashville, Tennessee
Christian Methodist Episcopal churches in Tennessee
Churches on the National Register of Historic Places in Tennessee
Neoclassical architecture in Tennessee
Churches completed in 1925
20th-century Methodist church buildings in the United States
Churches in Nashville, Tennessee
National Register of Historic Places in Nashville, Tennessee
Neoclassical church buildings in the United States